Inspectorate of Strategic Products is a Swedish government agency that answers to the Ministry for Foreign Affairs. The agency is located in Stockholm.

The agency controls the export of military equipment and dual-use products, ie products that may have both a civilian and a military use.

See also
Government agencies in Sweden.

External links

Inspectorate of Strategic Products
Military of Sweden
Foreign relations of Sweden